Practical Television, later known as Television and subsequently Television & Consumer Electronics, was a UK magazine for the electronics/TV servicing trade, enthusiasts, and the general public. The chief editor was F.J. Camm and it was published by George Newnes Ltd. Initially founded as a supplement to another publication in 1933, it was published as a monthly magazine from 1934 to 1938, and from 1950 to June 2008.

Publication history 
Practical Television first appeared in September 1933, initially as a four-page monthly supplement to Practical Wireless (launched 1932); it became a weekly supplement starting in January 1934.

Practical Television debuted as a separate, monthly publication in September 1934. In November 1938 it was merged back into Practical Wireless as a supplement, and in 1940 it disappeared from that publication as well.

After a nine-year hiatus, in March 1949, Practical Television restarted as a supplement in Practical Wireless. The magazine reappeared as a separate publication in April 1950, starting with a new issue No. 1.

With the October 1970 issue, the title was shortened to Television with the subtitle "Servicing, Construction, Colour Developments." By mid-2004 the magazine was called Television & Consumer Electronics.

After changes of ownership, the magazine was finally withdrawn from publication in June 2008; its final issue was June 2008.

References

Business magazines published in the United Kingdom
Defunct magazines published in the United Kingdom
Magazines established in 1934
Magazines disestablished in 2008
Science and technology magazines published in the United Kingdom
Professional and trade magazines
George Newnes Ltd magazines